Events from the year 1812 in France

Incumbents
 Emperor – Napoleon I

Events
 The Peninsular War (1807–1814)
 12 February – Metric system rescinded for everyday use
 24 June - 14 December – The French invasion of Russia

Arts and culture 
 The Charging Chasseur, painting by Théodore Géricault
 Fantasmagoriana, book by Jean-Baptiste Benoît Eyriès

Births
 4 January – Alexandre Monnet, bishop (died 1849)
 15 April – Théodore Rousseau, painter (died 1867)
 13 June – Adolphe Braun, photographer (died 1877)
 9 November – Paul Abadie, architect (died 1884)

Deaths

 13 February – Jacques Marie Boutet, actor and comic dramatist (born 1745) 
 24 February – Étienne-Louis Malus, military officer, engineer, physicist, and mathematician (born 1775) 
 24 July – Louis Thomas Villaret de Joyeuse, admiral (born 1747) 
 30 August – Gabriel-Marie Legouvé, poet (born 1764) 
 22 October – Alexis Joseph Delzons, general (born 1775) 
 29 October – Emmanuel Maximilien-Joseph Guidal, general (born 1764) 
 22 December – Pierre Henri Larcher, classical scholar and archaeologist (born 1726)

Exact date missing 
 Jean Baptiste Eblé, general (born 1758)

See also

References

1810s in France